Bunbury Cathedral Grammar School (often denoted BCGS), is an independent school in Gelorup, Western Australia, a semi-rural suburb 10 kilometres south of Bunbury.  Providing kindergarten, primary and secondary education, the school serves approximately 750 students and employs 190 staff.  The school is a global member of the Round Square Organization, and Diocesan School of the Anglican Diocese of Bunbury.

Bunbury Cathedral Grammar School's campus is situated on 33 hectares of bushland, consisting of a primary and secondary school, sporting and boarding facilities.

History
In 1968, a small group of volunteers, led by the bishop of the Anglican Diocese of Bunbury, Bishop Ralph Hawkins, organized the creation of an Anglican, co-educational day and boarding school. Bunbury Cathedral Grammar School became operational in 1972, with an enrolment of 78 students.

The school has published a magazine called the Grammarian semi-annually.

Bruce Matthews was the headmaster at the school from 1998 to 2011, when he left to take up a position on the inaugural board of the newly formed School Curriculum and Standards Authority. The headmaster that replaced Matthews was Michael Giles who joined the school in late 2011 from Great Southern Grammar.

Academics
The school has produced two Rhodes scholars: M. W. Rennie (1983) and Rachel Paterson (2012).

The school has performed well in the WACE exams and has consistently rated in the top 50 schools in the state, the top school in the South West and often is the top regional school in the state.

Alumni 
 Courtney Eaton, actress
 Ben Small (Senator for Western Australia, 2020–2022)

References

External links
 

Education in Bunbury, Western Australia
Educational institutions established in 1972
Anglican primary schools in Western Australia
Boarding schools in Western Australia
1972 establishments in Australia
Anglican secondary schools in Western Australia
Round Square schools